Medolago is a comune (municipality) in the Province of Bergamo in the Italian region of Lombardy, located about  northeast of Milan and about  southwest of Bergamo.

Medolago borders the following municipalities: Calusco d'Adda, Chignolo d'Isola, Cornate d'Adda, Paderno d'Adda, Solza, Suisio, Terno d'Isola.

Demographic evolution

References